The Battle of Modlin was a battle that took place during the 1939 German invasion of Poland at the beginning of the Second World War. Modlin Fortress was initially the headquarters of the Modlin Army until its retreat eastwards. From 13 to 29 September 1939, it served as a defensive citadel for Polish forces under the command of General Wiktor Thommée against assaulting German units. The fighting was closely linked with the strategic situation of the Battle of Warsaw.

The Polish forces defending the fortress included the armoured train Śmierć ("death") and the Modlin anti-aircraft battery, which was credited with shooting down more Luftwaffe planes than any other in the entire September campaign.

Fortress Modlin capitulated on 29 September, one of the last to lay down its arms in the campaign, and surrendered 24,000 troops. Several days earlier, Rochus Misch had attempted to negotiate the surrender of the fortress despite being wounded, an act for which he was awarded the Iron Cross.

Soldiers of the Panzer Division Kempf committed the Massacre in Zakroczym on 28 September 1939.

See also 

 List of World War II military equipment of Poland
 List of German military equipment of World War II

References

External links

 Modlin fortress as seen from a satellite - green cross marks the southern bridgehead pictured above

Battles of the Invasion of Poland
Sieges involving Germany
Sieges involving Poland
Warsaw Voivodeship (1919–1939)
September 1939 events